The 2018 Real Monarchs season is the fourth season for Real Monarchs in the United Soccer League (USL), the second-tier professional soccer league in the United States and Canada.

Club

Competitions

Pre-season

United Soccer League

Standings

Match results

Unless otherwise noted, all times in MDT (UTC-06)

Postseason

References

2017